This article refers to The University of Toledo College of Medicine and Life Sciences, a medical school in Toledo, Ohio (formerly the Medical College of Ohio, and the Medical University of Ohio).  For the former Medical College of Ohio in Cincinnati, see the article on University of Cincinnati College of Medicine.

The University of Toledo College of Medicine and Life Sciences is a medical school affiliated with the University of Toledo, a public university located in Toledo, Ohio, United States. The College is located on the University of Toledo's Health Science Campus in south Toledo.

History
Founded in 1964 as the Medical College of Ohio (MCO), its first class of medical students began their studies in 1969.

On March 31, 2006, Ohio Governor Bob Taft signed House Bill 478, which merged the University of Toledo with what was then known as the Medical University of Ohio (MUO), effective July 1, 2006.

Upon completion of the merger, the University of Toledo became the third largest member of the University System of Ohio in terms of operating budget, as well as one of only 17 public universities in the United States having colleges of business administration, education, engineering, law, medicine and pharmacy.

Academic Affiliation
In 2016, The University of Toledo began an affiliation with Toledo-based health system ProMedica. The partnership establishes a 50-year affiliation between the College and the health system to "attract and retain good medical talent in Toledo."

Academic and Clinical Departments

Notable alumni 
Karin J. Blakemore, medical geneticist
 Jerri Nielsen (née Cahill), Antarctic physician

Notes and references

External links
University of Toledo College of Medicine and Life Sciences
Academic Affiliation with ProMedica website
UT and MUO merger website

Medical schools in Ohio
Buildings and structures in Toledo, Ohio
Education in Toledo, Ohio
Educational institutions established in 1964
1964 establishments in Ohio